Janice Teixeira (born 20 May 1962) is a Brazilian former sports shooter. She competed in the women's trap event at the 2016 Summer Olympics. She suffered a stroke while working as commentator at the 2008 Summer Olympics.

References

External links
 

1962 births
Living people
Brazilian female sport shooters
Olympic shooters of Brazil
Shooters at the 2016 Summer Olympics
Place of birth missing (living people)
Pan American Games medalists in shooting
Shooters at the 2015 Pan American Games
Pan American Games bronze medalists for Brazil
South American Games silver medalists for Brazil
South American Games bronze medalists for Brazil
South American Games medalists in shooting
Competitors at the 2010 South American Games
20th-century Brazilian women
21st-century Brazilian women